Vathypedo (before 1928: Προσβάλα, Προσβάλλα Prosvala, Prosvalla) is a village and a former community in the Ioannina regional unit, Epirus, Greece. Since the 2011 local government reform it is part of the municipality North Tzoumerka, of which it is a municipal unit. The municipal unit has an area of 10.127 km2. Its population was 86 in 2011.

References

Populated places in Ioannina (regional unit)